Pseudapistosia similis is a moth in the family Erebidae. It was described by George Hampson in 1901. It is found in Bolivia.

References

Moths described in 1901
Phaegopterina